Raimonda is a predominantly Lithuanian feminine given name. Individuals with the name Raimonda include:
Raimonda Bložytė (born 1987), Lithuanian footballer 
Raimonda Gaetani (born 1942), Italian stage set and costume designer
Raimonda Kudytė (born 1975), Lithuanian footballer 
Raimonda Murmokaitė (born 1959), Lithuanian diplomat

Lithuanian feminine given names